Jeffrey Robert Hamilton (born March 19, 1964) is a former Major League Baseball third baseman.

Selected in the 29th round of the June 1982 MLB Amateur Draft, Hamilton eventually saw success as a member of the Pacific Coast League Albuquerque Dukes, batting over .320 over the course of two seasons before being called up to make his Major League Baseball debut on June 28, 1986. He was called up several times thereafter before becoming the Dodgers' full-time Third Baseman at the start of the 1989 season. Hamilton graduated from Carman-Ainsworth High School.

After a successful 1989 campaign, Hamilton began 1990 as the Dodgers starting third basemen. But after playing with a sore shoulder in spring training, Hamilton was shelved in early April after it was discovered he had torn his rotator cuff - which eventually required season-ending surgery. Hamilton ended up only playing in 7 games for the entire 1990 season.

Hamilton played portions of  six seasons during his career, all with the Los Angeles Dodgers.  Hamilton was a member of the Dodgers team that won the World Series in 1988 and appeared with Orel Hershiser and Rick Dempsey on the cover of the October 31st 1988 edition of Sports Illustrated. In 1989, he was sixth in the National League in doubles, with 35, and led the NL in putouts by a third baseman, with 139. He played his final MLB game on September 28, 1991, later retiring after a short return to the Albuquerque Dukes in 1992.

Although he was a position player throughout his entire career, he did appear in a ballgame in 1989 as a relief pitcher during a 22-inning ballgame against the Houston Astros. He was credited as the losing pitcher of that ballgame.  He struck out Billy Hatcher and Ken Caminiti before giving up the game-winning hit to Rafael Ramirez. The game, which lasted over 7 hours  was the longest in Houston Astros history.

References

External links

1964 births
Living people
Los Angeles Dodgers players
Baseball players from Flint, Michigan
Major League Baseball third basemen
Lethbridge Dodgers players
Lodi Dodgers players
Vero Beach Dodgers players
San Antonio Dodgers players
Albuquerque Dukes players